Dmitry Nikitich Begichev (28 September 1786 - 24 November 1855) was a Russian writer, governor of Voronezh Province, and senator.

Biography
Begichev was born into a family of the ancient nobility. He had a successful military and civil service career. He was governor of Voronezh Province from 1830 to 1836, and in 1840 he was appointed as a senator.

He published his literary works anonymously. His five-volume novel The Kholmsky Family was published in Moscow in 1832. The language of The Kholmsky Family is fluent and often colloquial. The novel contains numerous quotes from Russian and French literature, and even quotes of "worldly wisdom" from Benjamin Franklin. The Kholmsky Family is an important antecedent of Leo Tolstoy's War and Peace. Like War and Peace it reflects the world-view of the Russian gentry.

Family
 Father - Captain Nikita Begichev
 Mother - Alexandra Kologrivova
 Brother - Stepan Nikitich Begichev (b. 22/07/1785 - d. 03/09/1859), career military
 Sister - Elizaveta Nikitichna Begicheva (Yablochkova) (b. 1771 - d.1843), writer, grandmother of Pavel Yablochkov inventor of Yablochkov candle electric carbon arc lamp

References

Russian male novelists
Russian politicians
1786 births
1855 deaths
Privy Councillor (Russian Empire)